Asad Amanat Ali Khan  (25 September 1955 – 8 April 2007) was a Pakistani classical vocalist and ghazal singer belonging to the Patiala Gharana tradition of music. In a career spanning 32 years, Khan sang over 1,000 songs for Pakistan Television and movie soundtracks, in addition to performing traditional classical music across the world. He was particularly noted for his command over the ghazal style of singing. Khan was the son of the prominent classical vocalist Ustad Amanat Ali Khan. He was awarded the highest national literary award of Pakistan, the Presidential Pride of Performance, on 23 March 2007 for his significant contributions to classical music.

Early life and background
Asad Amanat Ali Khan was born in Lahore, Pakistan to renowned classical singer Ustad Amanat Ali Khan and his wife. His great-grandfather, Ali Baksh Khan, was the founder of the Patiala Gharana discipline of music and his grandfather, Akhtar Hussain, was an eminent musician in the patronage of the Maharaja of Patiala. Asad was 19 years old when his father died, and he trained in classical music primarily with his uncle, Bade Fateh Ali Khan who also encouraged Asad to form a singing duo with his youngest brother (Asad's uncle), Hamid Ali Khan.

Asad's youngest brother Shafqat Amanat Ali Khan is a pop, classical, and playback singer. He was the lead singer of the Pakistani music band Fuzön until 2006. Shafqat describes his brother as being an innovator of Eastern music: "What we call fusion music today...Asad bhai started doing it in the 70s and 80s. He had released this album from London...It was arranged in such a way that it had one classical piece, followed by a ghazal or a Punjabi folk song and then a popular number. [He] started singing arifana kalam and gave them a new spin. This Sufi wave that is so popular today, I would say Asad bhai is one of its pioneers."

Career
Khan started his musical career performing Patiala gharana thumris and recorded his first song at the age of 10. He began singing professionally after completing his FA (two year) degree and rose to prominence after singing his father's popular ghazal, Insha Ji Utho, which subsequently featured in almost every live concert he performed. He performed traditional classical music as part of the very successful singing duo with his uncle, Hamid Ali Khan, in the 1970s and 1980s, performing not only in Pakistan and India but also in the United States, Canada, The Netherlands, Australia, New Zealand, and Switzerland.

Like his father before him, Khan is credited with demystifying and simplifying complex classical ragas and adapting them for easy listening, thereby boosting their popularity and appeal among contemporary audiences.

Khan worked for Pakistan Television for many years and performed over 1,000 songs on live television. Nisar Bazmi, composer and PTV producer, who died one week before him, gave him his first break in live television singing. Khan also sang for a number of Pakistani movie soundtracks.

Death
Khan traveled to London, United Kingdom in January 2007 to receive treatment for a condition known as hypertrophic cardiomyopathy. He returned to Pakistan during his treatment to receive the Pride of Performance Award from the President of Pakistan on 23 March 2007. After receiving the award, he left Pakistan for London on 3 April 2007 to continue his treatment. In London, he suffered a cardiac arrest and collapsed in Cassiobury Park while he was with his family. He died in London on 8 April 2007. Khan is survived by his wife Sharmeen Khan and two children, Sikander and Tanya Khan.

Discography
Some of his most well-known songs are as follows:
 Awaz Who Jado sa (Saheli)
 Insha Ji Utho
 Ghar Wapis Jab Aaoge Tum
 Jo Bhi Dil Ki Hai
 Abhi Wahan Chal Diya
 Abhi Kaliyon Mein Chatak
 Umraan Langiyaan
 Main Tere Sang
 Kabhi Kaha Na Kisi Se
 Pyaar Nahii Hai Sur Se Jisko
 Abhi Kalion Mein
 Diyaar Yaar Geya
 Gham Tera Ham Ne Paa Liya
 Ham Yeh Samajh Kar Aaye
 Jo Bhi Dil Ki
 Dayar-e-Yaar Gaya
 Kal Chowdhwin Ki Raat Thi
 Tujhe Adam Nahin Milta
 Chand Sitaron Se
 Doob Gayen Sab Yaadein
 Zara Zara Dil Mein Dard Hua
 Apne Haathon Ki Lakiiron Mein
 Piya Dekhan Ko
 Hum Pyar Ke Deewane (from the film Naqshe Qadam)
 Kisi Aur Gham Mein Itni (lyrics: Mustafa Zaidi)
 Ek Lamha-e-Wisal Tha (Poet: Raees Warsi )
 Yuun Bhi Tou Raas Rooh Ko ( Poet: Raees Warsi )
 Bahot Mushkil Palat Kar Dekhna Tha (Poet: Faisal Hanif)
 Hasti Meri Mera Nizam (Poet: Muhammad Iqbal)
 Kachi Jai Tand Teri Yaari Si
 Main Nay Kaha Aaye (duet with Irum Hassan)
 Ankhain Ghazal Hain Apki

See also 

 Patiala Gharana
 Ali Baksh Jarnail
 Akhtar Hussain
 Amanat Ali Khan
 Bade Fateh Ali Khan
 Shafqat Amanat Ali Khan

References

External links
 

1955 births
2007 deaths
Burials at Mominpura Graveyard
Musicians from Patiala
Singers from Lahore
20th-century Pakistani male singers
Pakistani classical singers
Pakistani ghazal singers
Pakistani playback singers
Punjabi people
Recipients of the Pride of Performance
Patiala gharana
Urdu-language singers